The 2022–23 East of Scotland Football League (known as the Central Taxis East of Scotland League for sponsorship reasons) is the 94th season of the East of Scotland Football League, and the 9th season with its top division as part of the sixth tier of the Scottish football pyramid system. The season began on 30 July 2022. Tranent Juniors are the reigning champions but are unable to defend their title after gaining promotion to the Lowland Football League.

Teams
The following teams changed division after the 2021–22 season.

To East of Scotland Football League
Relegated from Lowland Football League
 Vale of Leithen

Transferred from West of Scotland Football League
Harthill Royal

From East of Scotland Football League
Promoted to Lowland Football League
 Tranent Juniors

Premier Division

The Premier Division reverted to a 16 team division, with Haddington Athletic and Oakley United promoted from First Division Conferences A and B respectively.

Stadia and locations

Notes

All grounds are equipped with floodlights, except Humbug Park (Crossgates Primrose) and Blairwood Park (Oakley United).

League table

Results

First Division
The First Division is made up of the four teams relegated from the Premier Division, along with those finishing 2nd to 7th in Conferences A and B.

Stadia and locations

Notes

League table

Results

Second Division
The Second Division consists of the remaining clubs finishing 8th to 15th in Conferences A and B, plus Whitburn and Syngenta who were promoted from Conference X.

Stadia and locations

Notes

League table

Results

Third Division
The Third Division features the remaining nine clubs from Conference X, along with Harthill Royal who joined from the West of Scotland League.

Stadia and locations

Notes

League table

Results

Notes
 Club with an SFA licence eligible to participate in the Lowland League promotion play-off should they win the Premier Division.

References

External links

East of Scotland Football League
6
SCO
Sco6